Trocodima lenistriata is a moth in the family Erebidae. It was described by Paul Dognin in 1906. It is found in Venezuela, Paraguay and Argentina.

References

Natural History Museum Lepidoptera generic names catalog

Moths described in 1906
Phaegopterina
Moths of South America